The 200 FC Terek Grozny season was the third successive season that the club played in the Russian Premier League, the highest tier of football in Russia, in which they finished 12th. They also took part in the 2010–11 Russian Cup, reaching the Round of 32 where they were defeated by Luch-Energiya.

Squad

Out on loan

Transfers

Winter

In:

 

Out:

Summer

In:

Out:

Competitions

Premier League

Results

League table

Russian Cup

Squad statistics

Appearances and goals

|-
|colspan="14"|Players who appeared for Terek Grozny but left during the season:

|}

Goal Scorers

Disciplinary record

References

FC Akhmat Grozny seasons
Terek Grozny